Oryba kadeni is a moth of the family Sphingidae first described by Schaufuss in 1870.

Distribution 
It is found from Central America (including Guatemala, Costa Rica, Panama and possibly Belize) to Brazil, Bolivia, Ecuador, Peru, Venezuela and French Guiana.

Description 
The wingspan is 102–116 mm. It is a large, heavy-bodied and large-eyed species with a bright green upperside and orange underside. The marginal band of the forewing upperside is strongly convex. Females have forewings which are much more rounded than those of the males.

Biology 
There are probably multiple generations per year.

The larvae feed on Isertia laevis.

References

Dilophonotini
Moths described in 1870